Dragon Hill Lodge is a U.S. Department of Defense - owned hotel in Seoul, South Korea.  It is co-located with and is a part of the Yongsan Garrison (which means "Dragon Mountain" in Korean) military community.

The Lodge is an Armed Forces Recreation Center (AFRC) resort hotel and serves thousands of guests each year, all of whom are required to be active or retired military, DOD employees, or their family members.  The Lodge was built completely with soldier-dollars with no congressional funding support. Rates are determined by the rank of the guest as well as the guest's reason for visiting. Guests traveling on business are charged a higher rate.

History
The facilities that now comprise the Lodge have their origins during the first year of the Korean War when a mess hall opened as a recreational facility for general officers known as Hartell House.  This mess opened in Busan, Korea on 7 July 1950, as the Commanding General's Mess, Eighth Army.  It was moved several times from Daegu, to Seoul, back to Daegu and returning to Seoul again during the course of the Korean War.  The Hartell House settled in several locations to include a location on the old Seoul National University campus before moving to its present building in 1952. Since 1978 the mess has served the Commanding Generals of United Nations Command, ROK/US Combined Forces, United States Forces Korea, and Eighth U.S. Army.

American military personnel and their families who wanted to spend R&R time in Seoul used to stay at the Naija Hotel, in downtown Seoul.  The Naija was comfortable, but small, had limited parking, and was distant from other American facilities at Yongsan.  The need for a new facility was obvious, and in 1987, ground was broken for the Dragon Hill Lodge, across the parking lot from what was the Eighth Army Officers Club.  The Dragon Hill Lodge, or DHL for short, was completed in 1990.  In subsequent years, an addition to the DHL created more guest rooms and The Point fitness center.  And, another addition created the Soldier's Tower, an additional wing with more guest rooms.

References

External links 
 Dragon Hill Lodge

Hotels in Seoul
Armed Forces Recreation Centers
Hotel buildings completed in 1990
Hotels established in 1990
1990 establishments in South Korea
Military installations of the United States in South Korea
Yongsan District
20th-century architecture in South Korea